The 2012 Union budget of India was presented by the Finance Minister Pranab Mukherjee on March 16, 2012.

References 

Union budgets of India
2012 in Indian economy
India